Balto II: Wolf Quest is a 2002 American animated adventure film. It is the sequel to Universal Pictures/Amblin Entertainment's 1995 Northern animated film Balto.

Plot 
One year after his heroic journey, Balto has mated with Jenna, and they now have a new family of six puppies in Alaska. Five of their puppies resemble their husky mother, while one pup named Aleu takes her looks from her wolfdog father. When they all reach eight weeks old, all of the other pups are adopted to new homes, but no one wants Aleu due to her wild animal looks, forcing her to live with her father. A year later when she is grown, Aleu is almost killed by a hunter who mistakes her for a wild wolf. Balto tells Aleu the truth about her wolf heritage, causing her to run away, hoping to find her place in the world. Balto then goes out into the Alaskan wilderness to find her. At the same time, Balto has been struggling with strange dreams of a raven and a pack of wolves, and he cannot understand their meaning. Balto resolves to find the meaning of these dreams as he searches for Aleu. His friends Boris, Muk, and Luk attempt to join him, but after they are halted by some unknown force, they realize that this journey is meant only for the father and daughter themselves.

Taking refuge in a cave, Aleu meets the field mouse Muru, who explains that Aleu should not be ashamed of her lineage, which tells her what she is but not who she is. Muru reveals himself to be Aleu's spirit guide and tells her to go on a journey of self-discovery. Balto and Aleu reunite when he saves her from the grizzly bear and reconcile, and find their way to the ocean, where they are attacked by a group of starving Northwestern wolves led by Niju, an arrogant and vicious wolf. The confrontation is defused by the elderly Nava, the true leader of the pack, who welcomes Balto and Aleu. Nava announces to his pack that the wolf spirit Aniu has contacted him in "dream visions". Aniu has told him that the caribou herd they depend on during the winter has moved across the ocean and will not return and that they will soon be led by a new leader, "the one who is a wolf but does not know". Nava believes that Balto, who is half wolf himself, is the chosen one that Aniu was speaking of. However, Niju refuses to abandon his homeland and takes control of the pack, and plots to steal from other animal clans in the area to survive the winter.

Aleu has a "dream vision" of the caribou herd crossing a bridge made of ice floes. The next morning, Niju prepares to lead an attack on a clan of bears, but is stopped by Balto just as a large group of ice floes in the ocean come together to form a land bridge. Balto then leads the pack across the bridge until Nava falls behind. When Aleu attempts to help Nava, Niju attacks, and Balto doubles back to save them, leaving the pack leaderless. Nava cannot make the journey across the ice in his old age, and Balto tells Niju to go lead the clan. Niju refuses, too afraid to leave his home, and soon returns to the shore. Balto prepares to go to the pack, but Aleu realizes that her true place is to take leadership of the pack as Nava foretold. Balto and Aleu say goodbye to each other before Aleu rejoins the pack and takes over as the leader. Back on shore, Nava bids farewell to Balto before going to look for Niju so they can survive together. The raven appears to Balto again, and transforms into Aniu, revealing herself to be his mother before he begins to make his way home.

Voice cast 
 Maurice LaMarche as Balto. He was voiced by Kevin Bacon in the original film.
 Jodi Benson as Jenna. She was voiced by Bridget Fonda in the original film.
 Lacey Chabert as Aleu
 David Carradine as Nava
 Mark Hamill as Niju
 Charles Fleischer as Boris. He was voiced by Bob Hoskins in the original film.
 Peter MacNicol as Muru
 Rob Paulsen as Terrier, Sumac, Wolverine #2, singing voice of Muru
 Nicolette Little as Dingo
 Melanie Spore as Saba
 Kevin Schon as Muk, Luk, Wolverine #1. Muk and Luk were voiced by Phil Collins in the original film.
 Joe Alaskey as Hunter, Nuk
 Monnae Michaell as Aniu
 Mary Kay Bergman as Fox, Wolverine #3
 Jeff Bennett as Yak

Balto II: Wolf Quest is the last film Bergman contributed to before she committed suicide on November 11, 1999, releasing it posthumously.

Production 
Following the original film's strong video sales, production and development on Balto II: Wolf Quest, as well as Balto III: Wings of Change, began in 1996 at Universal Studios's animation division, Universal Cartoon Studios. Due to the film not taking any historical references from the true story of Balto (as opposed to the original film), as well as having a completely different crew, only Balto, Boris, Jenna, Muk, and Luk were recast. Denis Leary and Jeff Bennett were considered for replacing Kevin Bacon, Balto's voice actor from the original film. Instead, Bennett settled for the role of Yak, and the role of Balto went to Canadian voice actor Maurice LaMarche. Voice-recording sessions took place in 1997 at Salami Studios in Hollywood.

After the actors recorded their voices, animating and filming commenced at the Taiwanese-American studio Wang Film Productions, because Amblimation, which did the animation for the original film, had gone out of business in 1997. Unlike the original film, it is entirely animated and contained no live action sequences. Although most of the film's animation was hand-drawn, the film contained multiple computer-assisted scenes, which were done by Robin Conover and Flammarion Ferreira. Additional CGI animation was provided by flashbangstudios.com and by Visual Approach. Visual Approach also designed the film's opening titles. Post-production took place at Complete Post in Los Angeles. Sound post-production took place at Hacienda Post in Burbank, California, and at Castle Oaks Productions in Calabasas, California.

This film features the final voice role of Mary Kay Bergman. The film was originally scheduled to be released in 2000, but was pushed back two years due to Bergman's death in 1999. Due to this, the characters that are featured here, including those that were voiced by Bergman, could not be brought back in the next film Balto III: Wings of Change as new characters are introduced.

Music

The songs are written by Michele Brourman and Amanda McBroom. A chorus performs several of the songs, and includes Amanda McBroom, George Ball, Roger Freeland, Ali Olmo, Lisa Harlow Stark and Rob Trow.

Original songs performed in the film include:

Awards 
Balto II: Wolf Quest was nominated for an Annie Award in 2003 for "Outstanding Storyboarding in an Animated Television Production".

Writer Dev Ross was awarded the Humanitas Prize in 2002 for her script in the Children's Animation category.

References

External links 

 
 

Animated films about dogs
2002 direct-to-video films
2000s adventure films
Films set in the 1920s
Direct-to-video sequel films
American children's animated adventure films
American children's animated drama films
American children's animated musical films
Universal Pictures direct-to-video animated films
2002 animated films
2002 films
Universal Animation Studios animated films
Films set in North America
2000s American animated films
Universal Pictures direct-to-video films
Animated films about wolves
2000s children's animated films
2000s English-language films